Daryl Bultor (born 17 November 1995) is a French volleyball player for Tourcoing Lille Métropole and the French national team.

He participated at the 2017 Men's European Volleyball Championship.

References

1995 births
Living people
French men's volleyball players
Volleyball players at the 2020 Summer Olympics
Olympic volleyball players of France
Medalists at the 2020 Summer Olympics
Olympic gold medalists for France
Olympic medalists in volleyball
Middle blockers